Selenops lobatse is a species of araneomorphae spider in the family Selenopidae.

Distribution 
The species is endemic to North West, South Africa.

Description 
The female holotype measures 9.70 mm.

Etymology 
The name of the species was given in reference to the place of its discovery, Lobatse.

Publications 
 Corronca, 2001 :  Three new species of Selenops Latreille, 1819 (Aranei: Selenopidae) from Afrotropical region. Arthropoda Selecta, .

References

External links 

Selenopidae
Endemic fauna of South Africa
Spiders described in 2001